Rachell Hofstetter (born January 8, 1992), better known as Valkyrae, is an American Internet personality. She is a co-owner of the gaming organization 100 Thieves and has been YouTube's most-watched female streamer since 2020.

Hofstetter began streaming on Twitch in 2015. She had her breakthrough by playing the competitive online game Fortnite in 2018 and joined 100 Thieves as their first female content creator. In 2020, she switched streaming platforms by signing an exclusive contract with YouTube. Later that year, she saw significant follower growth and reached her peak viewership when playing the online social deduction game Among Us, which led to her winning the Game Award for "Content Creator of the Year" and the Streamy Award for best live streamer. She was also named "Gaming Creator of the Year" by Adweek in 2021 and was included on Forbes 30 Under 30 list in 2022.

Early life 
Rachell Hofstetter was born on January 8, 1992, in Washington. She is of Filipino and German descent and has three brothers and one younger sister. She was raised in Moses Lake, Washington. She cites her mother as the reason she became interested in video games, who encouraged her to pursue it as a hobby from a young age. She attended community college and worked a job at GameStop to support herself, later graduating with an associate degree in arts and science.

Career 
While working at GameStop, Hofstetter began sharing her gaming hobby on Instagram, gaining a following. After being encouraged by her followers, she started live streaming on Twitch in 2015. She later began uploading her gaming content to YouTube and had her breakthrough by playing the competitive online game Fortnite in 2018. That October, she became the first female content creator for the gaming organization 100 Thieves.

On January 13, 2020, Hofstetter left Twitch for an exclusive streaming contract on YouTube. In her first three months on YouTube, she averaged around 1,500 concurrent viewers. Her stream then experienced significant growth and, in late 2020, regularly peaked at concurrent viewer counts exceeding 100,000. This was driven by her playing the online multiplayer social deduction game Among Us and collaborating with popular streamers like Disguised Toast, Sykkuno, Pokimane, PewDiePie and Cr1TiKaL, in addition to public figures like politician Alexandria Ocasio-Cortez, musician Lil Nas X and television personality Jimmy Fallon. Hofstetter became the fastest growing female streamer of 2020 and surpassed Pokimane as the year's most-viewed female streamer.

On April 7, 2021, Hofstetter and CouRageJD joined the ownership group of 100 Thieves, alongside Dan Gilbert, Scooter Braun, Drake, and its founder, Nadeshot. As co-owners, they received equity in the company, which Forbes valued at $190 million at the time. Throughout 2021, she made appearances in music videos for "DayWalker" by Machine Gun Kelly featuring Corpse Husband, as well as "Build a Bitch" and "Inferno" by Bella Poarch. In September 2022, Hofstetter became an ambassador for the fitness apparel brand Gymshark. On March 11, 2023, Hofstetter co-hosted the second annual Streamer Awards alongside its creator, QTCinderella; the ceremony averaged 300,000 live concurrent viewers.

RFLCT controversy 
On October 19, 2021, Hofstetter announced the launch of her skincare brand, RFLCT. The brand, primarily geared towards gamers and those who put in heavy screen time, claimed that users are susceptible to skin damage caused by prolonged exposure to blue light and that their products protect against it. RFLCT received backlash due to insufficient evidence supporting the claim; according to Kathleen Suozzi, the director of the aesthetic dermatology program at Yale University, unless someone was already prone to melasma or hyperpigmentation, they were unlikely to suffer any consequence of sitting in front of a screen for long periods of time. 

Hofstetter responded by stating "all of the hate, doubt, concerns, and criticisms are all warranted and valid" and that she was "very upset and confused" with the lack of information on its website, promising additional information supporting the products would be made available. She was later informed that the research conducted by RFLCT supporting the products—which she had been given access to during development—could not be released to the public. She then expressed a desire to part ways with RFLCT, but was contractually bound. On October 30, 2021, RFLCT ceased operation of its website and online store. A statement on the website read: "While we believe in the formulations created, after further reflection, have decided to move forward on new paths, effectively terminating the RFLCT brand."

Filmography

Film

Television

Music videos

Discography

Awards and nominations

See also 
 List of YouTubers

Notes

References

External links

1992 births
American people of German descent
American people of Filipino descent
American YouTubers
Gaming YouTubers
Let's Players
Living people
People from Los Angeles
People from Washington (state)
People from Moses Lake, Washington
The Game Awards winners
YouTube streamers
YouTube channels launched in 2014